Arx, ARX, or ArX may refer to:

ARX (Algorithmic Research Ltd.), a digital security company
ARX (gene), Aristaless related homeobox
ARX (operating system), an operating system
ArX (revision control), revision control software
Arx (Roman), a Roman citadel, and in particular:
The northern hump of the two forming the Capitoline Hill of ancient Rome
Arx, Landes, a commune of the Landes département in France
Arx Fatalis, a first person role-playing game developed by Arkane Studios in 2002
Arx, a sculpture by Lars Vilks
Americas Rallycross Championship, also known as ARX Rallycross
Add-Rotate-XOR; see block cipher

See also
Beretta ARX160, an assault rifle
ObjectARX, a software API for AutoCAD